Jim Haynes was an American-born figure in the British "underground" and alternative/counter-culture scene of the 1960s.

Jim or James Haynes may also refer to: 
 Jim Haynes (writer), Australian writer
 James Haynes (American football), American football linebacker
 James Haynes (cricketer), English cricketer
 J. C. Haynes (James Clark Haynes), mayor of Minneapolis